The Progressive People's Party (FVP) was a social liberal party of the late German Empire.

History 
It was formed on 6 March 1910 as a merger of Free-minded People's Party, Free-minded Union and German People's Party in order to unify various fragmented liberal groups represented in parliament.

Already during the 1907 federal election, the two Free-minded parties had joined forces supporting Chancellor Bernhard von Bülow, who had promised to implement structural reforms. This disputed Bülow-Block led to the split-off of the left-wing Democratic Union (DV) under Rudolf Breitscheid and Theodor Barth. Nevertheless, after Bülow's resignation in 1909 the major social liberal parties were able to join in an effective union.

The Progressives demanded full equal voting rights for all, the abolition of the Prussian three-class franchise system, a new local elections law and amendments to the Imperial Constitution transforming the empire into a parliamentary democratic monarchy. They also advocated the separation of church and state, free trade, a progressive taxation as well as safety, health and welfare of people at work. The party thereby distanced itself from Conservatives and the National Liberal Party. Leading members like Friedrich Naumann were still favouring economic liberalism, but gradually turned to the concept of a welfare state. However, a cooperation with the Social Democrats remained disputed. By 1912, the party was represented in 19 states of the German Empire, including the Alsatian Progress Party branch in the Imperial Territory of Alsace-Lorraine. Constituents were mainly middle class and academics, but also employees and unionists.

The Progressives became a major force in German parliamentarism especially during World War I. Though the circles around Naumann initially defended a German-dominated Mitteleuropa concept, the moderate forces led by Ludwig Quidde demanding peace negotiations prevailed. In July 1917, the party joined with the Social Democratic Party and the Catholic Centre to form the Reichstag majority that would pass the famous Peace Resolution. However, the initiative was not taken up by the government of Chancellor Georg Michaelis. When the Progressive Friedrich von Payer became Vice-Chancellor in November, all opportunities were missed.

The party was disbanded in 1918 after the fall of the empire, with most of its members joining the new German Democratic Party (Deutsche Demokratische Partei) of the Weimar Republic, merging the Progressives with the left wing of the old National Liberal Party.

See also 
 Contributions to liberal theory
 Liberal democracy
 Liberalism
 Liberalism in Germany
 Liberalism worldwide
 List of liberal parties

Liberal parties in Germany
Germany 1910
Defunct political parties in Germany
Political parties of the German Empire
Political parties established in 1910
Political parties disestablished in 1918
1910 establishments in Germany